Durgukondal is a village in the Kanker district (North Baster) of Chhattisgarh state, central India. The 2011 Census of India recorded 1,609 inhabitants in this town.

See also 
 Kanker district

References 

Villages in Kanker district